Taconic State Park is located in Columbia and Dutchess County, New York abutting Massachusetts and Connecticut within the Taconic Mountains. It features camping, hiking, bicycling, hunting, cross county skiing and other recreational opportunities.

Overview 
Taconic State Park is located within one of the largest unfragmented forests between Virginia and Maine, an area of 14,400 (5,800 ha) contiguous acres of protected open space spanning three states and designated as one of America's "Last Great Places" by The Nature Conservancy. The  South Taconic Trail and the  Harlem Valley Rail Trail pass through the park. Bash Bish Falls, Massachusetts' most famous waterfall, is accessible via a short trail from the park.

Geography

Taconic State Park consists of three non-contiguous tracts: the Copake Falls Area, the northernmost section, located in Copake Falls; Rudd Pond Area, the southernmost section, located in the town of North East, and an unnamed, central third tract, located in Ancram, New York.

The Taconic State Park tracts are located on the west face of the South Taconic Range of Taconic Mountains and include the summits of Brace Mountain, and the west faces of Alander Mountain, Sunset Rock, and Mount Fray.

Recreation
Both the Copake Falls and Rudd Pond areas offer camping and swimming. Amenities include cabin rentals, life guards, and interpretive programs in season. Hunting is also allowed in the park, in season. Trailheads are located on Rudd Pond Road and Quarry Hill Road (at the southern terminus of the South Taconic Trail) in North East; on Undermountain Road in Ancram; and on Falls Road, Valley Road, and Sunset Rocks Road in Copake Falls. Bash Bish Falls is located in Massachusetts, across the border from the Copake Falls Area and accessible via a short path from the trailhead in New York.

The Harlem Valley Rail Trail is a paved bicycle and pedestrian path, partly completed, that will run  from Wassaic to Chatham, New York.  of the trail have been completed; trailheads within Taconic State Park are located at the Copake Falls Area and at Undermountain Road in Ancram.

The South Taconic Trail runs the western ridgecrest of the South Taconic Range, paralleling the Appalachian Trail which runs along the east ridgecrest of the same range; the trail features balds with views spanning the Hudson River Valley. It runs along the east side of the park at the state border and ridgecrest and descends to Bash Bish Falls. Mount Frissell, the highest point in Connecticut, is accessible from the central tract trailhead in Ancram. The Alander Mountain Trail and Mount Frissel Trail link the Appalachian Trail to the Copake Falls Campground and South Taconic Trail. The trails at Rudd Pond are not yet integral to the rest of the trail system. but a connection is in the works

Copake Falls area

This section of Taconic State Park is located on New York State Route 344, and offers several different attractions for the visitors. The park is open all around the year, with hours of sunrise to sunset and can change due to weather. The park hosts a campground, which is only open from May to December, and a cabin area, which is open year-round, with access to nearby skiing areas.

The Copake Falls area of the park services several different attractions. These include a beach for swimming, a wading pool, cabins, camping sites, hiking trails, the Iron Works Museum, a visitor center, picnic tables, scenic overlooks, snowmobiling trails, waterfalls, biking trails, playground equipment, fishing and hunting, a pavilion for parties and picnicking, and winter activities such as cross-country skiing.

The primary swimming site is a  flooded ore pit on the western side of the park.  The hamlet of Copake Falls (formerly Copake Iron Works), just outside the park, was an iron mining and smelting center during the 19th century and several smaller ore pits dot the vicinity. A portion of the former New York Central Railroad right-of-way that runs through Copake Falls has been converted into a paved bike path that winds through forest and farmland south of the town.

Rudd Pond area

Rudd Pond area is in the northeast corner of Dutchess County, New York.  The park is located in the town of North East, near the border of Connecticut, north of the village of Millerton.  The park offers a beach, picnic tables, a playground, hiking, deer hunting, fishing, a boat launch, a campground with tent and trailer sites, and ice skating.

See also

 Bash Bish Falls
 Benjamin Osborn House
 Copake Iron Works Historic District 
 Copake Falls (NYCRR station)
 Taconic Outdoor Education Center
 List of New York state parks
 Taconic Outdoor Education Center
 List of New York state parks

References

External links
Nature Conservancy overview of the South Taconic Range
The Harlem Valley Rail Trail
Appalachian Trail information
New York - New Jersey Trail Conference
 New York State Parks: Taconic State Park – Copake Falls Area
 Friends of Taconic State Park
 New York State Parks: Taconic State Park - Rudd Pond Area
 New York-New Jersey Trail Conference: Taconic State Park details and trail information

State parks of New York (state)
Taconic Mountains
Parks in Dutchess County, New York
Parks in Columbia County, New York
Museums in Columbia County, New York
Industry museums in New York (state)
North East, New York